Jeremias Salomão Manjate (born 10 November 1998) is a Mozambican professional basketball player who plays for Sporting CP.

References

1998 births
Living people
Sporting CP basketball players
Centers (basketball)
Sportspeople from Maputo
Mozambican men's basketball players
Mozambican expatriate basketball people in Portugal